Mike Kildevæld (born 7 August 1966) is a Danish snowboarder. He competed in the men's giant slalom event at the 1998 Winter Olympics.

References

External links
 

1966 births
Living people
Danish male snowboarders
Olympic snowboarders of Denmark
Snowboarders at the 1998 Winter Olympics
People from Kalundborg
Sportspeople from Region Zealand